Hourglass is the fourteenth studio album by singer-songwriter James Taylor released in 1997. It was his first studio album in six years since 1991's New Moon Shine. It was a huge commercial success, reaching No. 9 on the Billboard 200, his first Top 10 album in sixteen years and also provided a big adult contemporary hit, "Little More Time With You". 

The album also gave Taylor his first Grammy since JT, when he was honored with Best Pop Album in 1998. The album also won producer/engineer Frank Filipetti a Grammy that year for Best Engineered Album. The majority of the album was recorded using a Yamaha O2R mixer and three Tascam DA-88 multitrack recorders, which were early digital devices not typically used by top level artists, as most major label records were still being recorded to analog tape at that time.

The album was dedicated to Don Grolnick who died in 1996 due to Non-Hodgkin's lymphoma.

Background
Hourglass was an introspective album with lyrics that focused largely on Taylor's troubled past and family. "Jump Up Behind Me" paid tribute to his father's rescue of him after the Flying Machine days, and the long drive from New York City back to his home in Chapel Hill. "Enough to Be On Your Way" was inspired by the alcoholism-related death of his brother Alex earlier in the decade. The themes were also inspired by Taylor's divorce from actress Kathryn Walker, which took place in 1996. Rolling Stone found that "one of the themes of this record is disbelief", while Taylor told the magazine that it was "spirituals for agnostics."

Track listing
All songs by James Taylor unless otherwise noted.
"Line 'Em Up" – 4:45
"Enough to Be on Your Way" – 5:29
"Little More Time with You" – 3:53
"Gaia" – 5:32
"Ananas" – 5:45
"Jump Up Behind Me" – 3:30
"Another Day" – 2:23
"Up Er Mei" – 3:49
"Up from Your Life" – 5:17
"Yellow and Rose" – 4:55
"Boatman" (Livingston Taylor, M. Taylor) – 3:59
"Walking My Baby Back Home" (Fred E. Ahlert, Roy Turk) – 2:27
"Hangnail" (also known as "Money O Money") – 2:24

Personnel 
 James Taylor – lead vocals, acoustic guitar, penny whistle (2), harmonica (10)
 Clifford Carter – keyboards
 Bob Mann – guitars
 Dan Dugmore – pedal steel guitar (10, 11)
 Ross Traut – high-strung guitar (11)
 Jimmy Johnson – bass guitar (1-3, 5–8, 10-12)
 Edgar Meyer – cello arrangements (2, 7), acoustic bass (4, 9)
 Carlos Vega – drums, percussion
 Mark O'Connor – fiddle (2)
 Yo-Yo Ma – cello (2, 7)
 Stanley Silverman – cello arrangements (2, 7)
 Stevie Wonder – harmonica (3)
 Branford Marsalis – soprano saxophone (4), alto saxophone (9)
 Michael Brecker – tenor saxophone (5), EWI (6) 
 Rob Mounsey – horn arrangements (5)
 Valerie Carter – backing vocals
 David Lasley – backing vocals
 Kate Markowitz – backing vocals
 Arnold McCuller – backing vocals
 Sting – backing vocals (6)
 Jill Dell'Abate – backing vocals (8)
 Shawn Colvin – backing vocals (10)

Production 
 Producers – Frank Filipetti and James Taylor 
 Associate Producer – Jill Dell'Abate
 Production Assistant – Ted Cammann
 Engineered and Mixed by Frank Filipetti 
 Assistant Engineers – Tim Gerron and Pete Karam
 Mix Assistant – Pete Karam
 Technical Support – John Morrison
 Mastered by Ted Jensen at Sterling Sound (New York, NY).
 Art Direction – Stephanie Mauer
 Design – Chris Quinn
 Photography – Herb Ritts
 Management – Cathy Kerr for PAM Artist Management.

Charts

Weekly charts

Year-end charts

Certifications

References

1997 albums
James Taylor albums
Albums produced by Frank Filipetti
Columbia Records albums
Grammy Award for Best Pop Vocal Album
Grammy Award for Best Engineered Album, Non-Classical
Albums recorded at MSR Studios